Robert Brian Shillinglaw (1 July 1939 – 17 October 2007), also known by the nickname of "Shill", was a Scottish rugby union and professional rugby league footballer who played in the 1950s and 1960s. He played representative level rugby union (RU) for Scotland, and at club level for Gala RFC, and representative level rugby league (RL) for Other Nationalities, and at club level for Whitehaven, Wigan and Leigh. Shillinglaw served with the King's Own Scottish Borderers.

Playing career

Rugby union
He also played for Gala RFC, for whom he played sixty five times, scoring fourteen tries.

Rugby league

Shillinglaw transferred to Whitehaven in 1961. He was then signed by Wigan in 1962 for a transfer fee of £5,500. He went on to score 25 tries in 42 appearances for Wigan. Shillinglaw also played for Leigh.

Shillinglaw represented Other Nationalities (RL) while at Wigan, he played  in the 2–19 defeat by St. Helens at Knowsley Road, St. Helens on Wednesday 27 January 1965, to mark the switching-on of new floodlights.

Personal life
Shillinglaw was a bricklayer by trade, and was offered the sum of £5,000 to defect to rugby league for Whitehaven in 1961 (based on increases in average earnings, this would be approximately £233,100 in 2016).

Death
Shillinglaw died aged 68 in Borders General Hospital, Melrose, Scottish Borders.

References

External links

Statistics at wigan.rlfans.com

1939 births
2007 deaths
Gala RFC players
King's Own Scottish Borderers soldiers
Leigh Leopards players
Other Nationalities rugby league team players
Rugby league halfbacks
Rugby league players from Scottish Borders
Rugby union players from Scottish Borders
Scotland international rugby union players
Scottish rugby league players
Scottish rugby union players
Whitehaven R.L.F.C. players
Wigan Warriors players